Mila caespitosa is a species of cacti (family Cactaceae) and the only species of the genus Mila. Its generic name is an anagram of Lima, Peru, the city near which the plant is found. The genus was first thought to comprise 13 species, until recent studies suggest they form one very variable species.

References 

Trichocereeae
Cacti of South America
Endemic flora of Peru
Vulnerable flora of South America